The Borrowers is a 2011 British television film starring Stephen Fry, Christopher Eccleston and Victoria Wood, based broadly on Mary Norton's 1952 novel The Borrowers.

Plot

The Clock family (tiny human-like "Borrowers") live under the floorboards at the Driver–Hellman house, suspected but so far uncaught by Mrs Driver (Victoria Wood), grandmother of young James Hellman (Charlie Hiscock). Daughter Arrietty Clock (Aisling Loftus) is seen by James and they become friends, but his grandmother's suspicions are heightened. Lifting a floorboard, she finds missing items, including furniture from James' dead mother's dollhouse. Searching online for information on "little people", Mrs Driver befriends a London university Professor Mildeye (Stephen Fry) online. Unlike his skeptical colleagues, she asks more about his specialty, Homo sapiens redactus. He visits to learn more of Mrs Driver's sightings, but James tries to take the blame for all the 'borrowings.'

Their secret home compromised, the Clocks escape via a drainpipe to the sewers, where Pod (Christopher Eccleston) berates his daughter. Her parents then take Arrietty to the disused City Road tube station, where there is a thriving urban community of little people she had known nothing of. She is nearly run over by Spiller (Robert Sheehan), a biker-type leader. Arrietty's mother Homily (Sharon Horgan) makes Spiller apologise, and after Pod hires Spiller with a gold coin ('borrowed' from Mrs Driver) to guide them to a new home, the youths become friendlier.

Mildeye and his lab assistant Jenny (Anne Hirsch) set an array of traps for the Clocks in the sewers around the Hellman-Driver home. Arrietty triggers one, but her parents push her out of the way and are caught themselves. Despite her protestations, Spiller drags Arrietty away to safety at Pod's request. Mildeye takes the captured Clocks to his lab, but James deletes Mildeye's phone message to his grandmother about the capture. Mrs Driver berates James' father Robert (Shaun Dooley) for being away too much (though he is absent in order to seek work), but is concealing from him mounting arrears that may lose them their home.

Anxious to rescue her parents, Arriety argues with and leaves Spiller, but he follows and saves her from a street cleaning vehicle, and they seek safety by hiding in a miniature nativity scene at a church. Spiller explains to her why Pod had exiled himself from other Borrowers - he had had to sacrifice his niece Eggletina to save the Borrower community, making him a reluctant hero. The two return to James' house to seek his help.

Pod and Homily try to escape, but Mildeye catches them and learns they can talk. He prepares to present them to the world the next day at an academic conference, seen trailered by James on the nightly BBC news. With James' help, Spiller and Arrietty fly over the conference venue in James' new model plane, a Christmas gift from his returned father. They drop from parachutes, and climb through air vents and ducting to the lab.

James distracts Mildeye and Jenny by telling them of more little people communities, and secretly puts a modified remote control car inside a vent duct to aid the Borrowers' escape. Mildeye gets back to the lab just too late to prevent the Clocks getting away, and chases them through corridors, lifts and stairways, but they reach James who runs from the reception area with his friends inside his rucksack. Meanwhile, Jenny tries to catch Spiller in the lab.

All but Spiller safely at home watch the conference online: Mildeye's audience leave when he can only display a doll's jacket. When James closes the laptop, Spiller (who has sneaked in unseen) asks "Did you really think they'd catch me?" Arrietty finally admits she likes him, and the embarrassed Spiller claims he only wanted the gold coin. James picks up this rare coin that his Grandmother was asking about before, and sets it on the floor of his mum's bedroom for Mrs Driver to find. James and Robert sell the coin to raise money for their house and for Christmas. Robert is puzzled as to why all of the strawberry creams are missing from the chocolate tin that had been 'borrowed' from by Pod at the start of the film.

At the celebration under the floorboards, Pod and Homily permit Arrietty freedom to leave. She chooses to return to the Borrower city with Spiller. After their farewells are said outside by the drainpipe and Arrietty promises to visit, the ending is a still of Arrietty shooting out of the pipe into the sewers in mid-air. In the post credits, Mrs Driver slips a strawberry cream chocolate down the borrower hole and whispers "Merry Christmas".

Cast
 Christopher Eccleston as father Pod Clock, a Borrower.
 Sharon Horgan as mother Homily Clock, a Borrower.
 Aisling Loftus as daughter Arrietty Clock, a Borrower.
 Robert Sheehan as Spiller, a Borrower.
 Francis Chouler as Spiller's Mate, a Borrower.
 "Beans" (human beings)
 Charlie Hiscock as James Millman, the boy who finds the Borrowers
 Victoria Wood as Mrs Driver, James' grandmother
 Shaun Dooley as Robert Millman, James' father
 Stephen Fry as Professor Mildeye
 Anne Hirsch as Jenny, Professor Mildeye's assistant

See also
List of films featuring miniature people

References

External links
 
 

British television films
2011 television films
2011 films
The Borrowers
British fantasy films
Films based on British novels
Films based on children's books
Films directed by Tom Harper
Television series by Working Title Television
2010s English-language films
2010s British films